The IWC Super Indy Championship is a professional wrestling championship in the wrestling promotion International Wrestling Cartel.  The championship was first awarded on March 22, 2002, when Super Hentai defeated Christopher Daniels in the finals of the first Super Indy tournament.

There have been 58 reigns among 33 wrestlers with 18 vacancies.  Most of the vacancies came due to the Super Indy Tournament.  The inaugural champion was Super Hentai.  John McChesney has the most reigns at seven.  Super Hentai has the longest singular reign at 357 days.  He accomplished this in two separate reigns.  Jason Gory, Jonathan Gresham, David Starr, and Sam Adonis have the shortest reigns at less than one day.  Super Hentai has the longest combined reign at 826 days.

Derek Dillinger is the current champion in his first reign.  He defeated Andrew Palace, Anthony Young, and Jaxon Argos in a four-way match at Reloaded 8.0 on January 22, 2022, to win the vacant championship.

Title history 

Names

Reigns

|}

Reigns by combined length

Key

References

Super Indy